John Parkinson (born 7 November 1944) is a former Australian rules footballer who played with Claremont in the West Australian National Football League (WANFL) and Collingwood in the Victorian Football League (VFL).

A rover, Parkinson made his debut for Claremont in 1963. He was a premiership player in 1964 and in 1967 won both a Sandover Medal and best and fairest award. During his time at Claremont he also topped their goal kicking on three occasions.

Parkinson joined VFL side Collingwood in 1971 and played three games that year before suffering a season ending broken collarbone.

He finished his career at Claremont, rejoining them in 1972 and retiring at the end of the 1973 season having played 156 WANFL games.

References

1944 births
Collingwood Football Club players
Claremont Football Club players
Sandover Medal winners
Living people
Australian rules footballers from Western Australia